Fa'ilolo is a village in the far west of Tutuila Island, American Samoa. It is located just south of 'Amanave, close to the island's westernmost point, Cape Taputapu. It is located in Lealataua County.

Demographics

References

Villages in American Samoa
Tutuila